Malasaurus is an extinct genus of therocephalian therapsids which existed in Russia. The type species is Malasaurus germanus.

References

Extinct animals of Russia
Ictidosuchids
Permian synapsids
Therocephalia genera